Lankwitz is a German locality (Ortsteil) within the borough (Bezirk) of Steglitz-Zehlendorf, Berlin. Until 2001 it was part of the former borough of Steglitz.

History
The locality was first mentioned in 1239 with the name of Lankowice. Autonomous Prussian municipality of the former Teltow district, Lankwitz was incorporated into Berlin in 1920 as part of the district Steglitz, with the "Greater Berlin Act".

Geography
Lankwitz is situated in the southern suburb of Berlin, close to the borders with the Brandenburg. It borders with the localities of Steglitz, Lichterfelde, Mariendorf, Marienfelde (both in Tempelhof-Schöneberg district) and, in a short point represented by a bridge over the Teltowkanal, with Tempelhof. The Teltowkanal also remarks the boundary between Lankwitz and Steglitz.

Transport
The locality is served by S-Bahn at the rail station of Lankwitz (lines S25 and S26). The S2 only crosses the quarter and remarks its border with Mariendorf. Lankwitz is also served by numerous bus lines.

Photogallery

Organisations 
The following organisations are based in Lankwitz:
Berliner Synchron (post-production dubbing company)
Mater Dolorosa (Berlin-Lankwitz) (Roman Catholic parish)
Stiftung Mater Dolorosa Berlin-Lankwitz (Foundation)

Buildings 
The following buildings are located in Lankwitz:
Lankwitz station

Personalities
Martin Benrath (1926–2000)
Mithat Demirel (b. 1978)
Heinz Henschel (1920–2006), German Ice Hockey Hall of Fame, and IIHF Hall of Fame inductee
Marianne Rosenberg (b. 1955)
Peter M. Gresshoff (b. 1948) Professor of Molecular Genetics, legume nodulation expert (now retired in Brisbane Australia). formerly student in Kastanien-Schule (Lichterfelde) and Schulfarm Insel Scharfenberg).

References

External links

 Lankwitz official website
 Lankwitz page on www.berlin.de
View of the coat of arms of Lankwitz

Localities of Berlin